Nagao Sakurai（桜井長雄） (November 5, 1896 – July 1973) of the Imperial Palace of Tokyo was a landscape architect.

Notable designs 

Japanese Tea Garden, Central Park, San Mateo, California.
Nishinomiya Japanese Garden, in the Manito Park and Botanical Gardens, Spokane, Washington, 1967
Zen Garden and area in front of Tea House, both within the Japanese Tea Garden of Golden Gate Park, in San Francisco
The Hannah Carter Japanese Garden, Bel-Air, completed in 1961 
The Japanese Garden in Micke Grove Regional Park, Lodi, California, dedicated in 1965
Japanese exhibit in the 1939-1940 Golden Gate International Exposition, a specialized World's Fair, Treasure Island, San Francisco
Japanese exhibit in the 1939 New York World's Fair with Dr. Takashi Tamura

See also
Gilroy Yamato Hot Springs, after 1938
William A. Pomeroy garden in Sausalito, 1956  
Robert Pomeroy garden, Quail Hill, in Ross, CA, 1970-1971

References

American people of Japanese descent
Japanese landscape architects
1896 births
1973 deaths